Jørn Andersen (born 3 February 1963), sometimes written as Jörn, is a Norwegian-German football manager and former player. He is the head coach of the Hong Kong national team.

Club career

Norway
Born in Fredrikstad, Andersen's career started at local team Østsiden where he remained until 1982. Subsequently, he moved to Fredrikstad and netted seven goals in 43 Norwegian Premier League appearances. The striker was transferred to Vålerenga ahead of the 1985 season. Andersen was able to score 23 goals in just 22 matches for the Oslo side.

Germany
In 1985, 1. FC Nürnberg signed the Norwegian. In 78 matches Andersen scored 28 goals before he moved to Eintracht Frankfurt. In 1990 Andersen became the first foreign player to be top goalscorer in a season with 18 goals in the Bundesliga. In 1990–91 Andersen played for Fortuna Düsseldorf and returned to the Frankfurt side. After that spell he joined Hamburger SV (1994–95) and Dynamo Dresden to play in the Bundesliga.

Switzerland
From Dresden, Andersen headed to Switzerland and FC Zürich in 1995, but was not successful as he scored only twice in 33 appearances. After the 1997–98 season he left FC Lugano to join FC Locarno.

International career
Andersen made his debut for the Norway national team in 1985 and earned 27 caps, scoring five goals. His last international match was a European Championship qualifying match against Hungary in October 1990, coming on as a substitute for Jahn Ivar Jakobsen.

Managerial career
Andersen became youth manager of FC Luzern and returned to Germany again to manage the then-second-tier team Rot-Weiß Oberhausen from 2003 until 2004. After that spell he assisted Horst Köppel at Borussia Mönchengladbach.

In May 2007, he signed to Greek top-flight team Skoda Xanthi to manage them from 2007 to 2008 on, but in June 2007 the contract was dissolved for private reasons.

In late 2007, he signed for 2. Bundesliga strugglers Kickers Offenbach, but was unable to save them from relegation.

On 20 May 2008, he signed a two-year deal with 2. Bundesliga outfit Mainz 05, and under his reign the team achieved promotion to the Bundesliga. Despite the team's success, Andersen was fired on 3 August 2009.

Mid December 2010, he was named manager of the Greek Super League team Larissa. After on 24 days in office, where the team lost three league matches and was knocked out of the cup competition, without scoring a single goal, he was let go.

Six months later, Andersen returned to Germany take charge of second division side Karlsruher SC.

Andersen became manager of Austria Salzburg on 2 January 2015.

After leaving Austria Salzburg in December 2015, Andersen was appointed as manager of North Korea in May 2016. It marked the first time North Korea had appointed a foreign manager since 1993. In 2018, he departed from North Korea after two years working with the team.

In March 2018, he was reportedly linked to Hong Kong.

In June 2018, he was announced as the new manager of South Korean side Incheon United, in the K-League. He was sacked on 15 April 2019 with Incheon at the bottom of the table after collecting just four points from seven matches.

In December 2021, Andersen was appointed as the head coach of Hong Kong, succeeding Mixu Paatelainen. In June 2022, he successfully led the Hong Kong Team in qualifying for the AFC Asian Cup 2023, which was the first time in 54 years.

Personal life
He is the son of handball player Bjørg Andersen.

Andersen became a German citizen in 1993. His son, Niklas, is also a former Bundesliga player. Andersen is married and lives in Bad Reichenhall in Bavaria, Germany.

Managerial statistics

Honours
Individual
 Norwegian Premier League top scorer: 1985
 Bundesliga top scorer: 1990

References

External links

Jørn Andersen Interview

Living people
1963 births
Norwegian emigrants to Germany
Naturalized citizens of Germany
Sportspeople from Fredrikstad
Norwegian footballers
Association football forwards
Norway international footballers
Fredrikstad FK players
Vålerenga Fotball players
1. FC Nürnberg players
Eintracht Frankfurt players
Fortuna Düsseldorf players
Hamburger SV players
Dynamo Dresden players
FC Lugano players
Kicker-Torjägerkanone Award winners
FC Zürich players
Eliteserien players
Bundesliga players
Norwegian football managers
Bundesliga managers
Xanthi F.C. managers
Kickers Offenbach managers
1. FSV Mainz 05 managers
Athlitiki Enosi Larissa F.C. managers
Karlsruher SC managers
SV Austria Salzburg managers
2. Bundesliga managers
Incheon United FC managers
North Korea national football team managers
Norwegian expatriate footballers
Norwegian expatriate football managers
Norwegian expatriate sportspeople in Germany
Expatriate footballers in Germany
Expatriate football managers in Germany
Norwegian expatriate sportspeople in Switzerland
Expatriate footballers in Switzerland
Expatriate football managers in Switzerland
Norwegian expatriate sportspeople in Greece
Expatriate football managers in Greece
Norwegian expatriate sportspeople in Austria
Expatriate football managers in Austria
Norwegian expatriate sportspeople in North Korea
Expatriate football managers in North Korea
Expatriate footballers in West Germany
Norwegian expatriate sportspeople in West Germany